Ballycowan or Ballycowen is a barony in County Offaly (formerly King's County), Republic of Ireland.

Etymology
Ballycowan derives its name from Ballycowan Castle (near Tullamore) and the townland of Ballycowan (Irish Baile Mhic Comhainn, "settlement of Mac Comhainn").

Location

Ballycowan is located in north County Offaly, around the valleys of the Clodiagh River and Silver River.

History
Ballycowan was part of the territory of the Ó Maolmhuaidh (O'Molloy) sept of the Southern Uí Néill. The Uí Shuanaig (Fox?) sept is cited here near Rathan.

List of settlements

Below is a list of settlements in Ballycowan:
Durrow
Rahan
Screggan
Tullamore

References

Baronies of County Offaly